Olenecoceras is a genus of Middle Cambrian fossils that, once believed to be a cephalopod, has since been excluded from that group (although no alternative classification has been offered). The genus was established by Zakhar Grigor'evich Balashov in 1966, from the river Olenyok.

See also
 Vologdinella – another genus named by Balashov, also was formerly believed to be a cephalopod

References

Cambrian invertebrates
Enigmatic prehistoric animal genera
Fossil taxa described in 1966